The Roman Catholic Diocese of Guarabira is a diocese located in the city of Guarabira in the Ecclesiastical province of Paraíba in Brazil.

History
 11 October 1980: Established as Diocese of Guarabira from the Metropolitan Archdiocese of Paraíba

Leadership
 Bishops of Guarabira (Roman rite), in reverse chronological order
 Bishop Aldemiro Sena dos Santos (4 October 2017 – present)
 Bishop Francisco de Assis Dantas de Lucena (28 May 2008 – 13 July 2016), appointed Bishop of Nazaré, Pernambuco
 Bishop Antônio Muniz Fernandes, O.Carm. (4 February 1998 – 22 November 2006), appointed Archbishop of Maceió, Alagoas
 Bishop Marcelo Pinto Carvalheria (9 November 1981 – 29 November 1995), appointed Archbishop of Paraíba

External links
 GCatholic.org
 Catholic Hierarchy

Roman Catholic dioceses in Brazil
Christian organizations established in 1980
Guarabira, Roman Catholic Diocese of
Roman Catholic dioceses and prelatures established in the 20th century